Avgustovka is a rural locality (a selo) in Radyschevskoye Rural Settlement of Novouzensky District, Saratov Oblast, Russia. The population was 67 as of 2010. There are 2 streets.

Geography 
The village is located on the left bank of the Maly Uzen River, 43 km west of Novouzensk (the district's administrative centre) by road. Maytubek is the nearest rural locality.

References 

Rural localities in Saratov Oblast